Stictophacidium is a genus of lichenized fungi in the family Stictidaceae.

References

Ostropales
Lichen genera
Ostropales genera